Juanita Clayton (born 10 January 1969) is a Canadian softball player. She competed in the women's tournament at the 1996 Summer Olympics. Clayton was inducted to the Manitoba Sports Hall of Fame in 2008.

References

External links
 

1969 births
Living people
Canadian softball players
Olympic softball players of Canada
Softball players at the 1996 Summer Olympics
People from Manitou, Manitoba
Softball people from Manitoba